Sabre Ace: Conflict Over Korea is a video game developed by American studio Eagle Interactive and published by Virgin Interactive for Windows in 1997.

Gameplay
Sabre Ace: Conflict Over Korea is a game featuring early jet fighters and aircraft with piston-engines from the Korean War era.

Development
The game was showcased at E3 1997.

Reception
Next Generation reviewed the PC version of the game, rating it three stars out of five, and stated that "it is the vanilla nature of the gameplay that finally reduces Sabre Ace to an average experience rather than the superior one that its individual parts would make it seem."

Reviews
PC Zone #62 (1998 April)
Computer Gaming World #163 (Feb 1998)
PC Games - Dec, 1997
PC Player (Germany) - Jan, 1998
GameSpot - Nov 26, 1997
GameStar - Jan, 1998

References

1997 video games
Combat flight simulators
Korean War video games
Video games developed in the United States
Video games set in Korea
Virgin Interactive games
Windows games
Windows-only games